Jorge Ferreira da Silva (born 14 December 1967 in Carangola, Minas Gerais), commonly known as Palhinha, is a retired Brazilian footballer who played as an attacking midfielder or as a forward.

Clubs career
Palhinha played for São Paulo in the golden years of 1992 and 1993 – alongside star players like Raí, Leonardo, Toninho Cerezo, Cafu and Müller – to win the Copa Libertadores and Intercontinental Cup twice, in 1992 and 1993. In 1992, he also was the top scorer of the Copa Libertadores, with 7 goals.

He also conquered the São Paulo State Championship in 1992 against the Palmeiras, and later became the double champions of Recopa Sudamericana in 1993 and 1994 against Cruzeiro and Botafogo, respectively. Moreover, he helped São Paulo beat Flamengo to triumph Supercopa Libertadores in 1993.

In 2001, he helped Alianza Lima to win the Apertura Championship in its centennial year. This feat was obtained under Brazilian manager Paulo Autuori. 
 
With Cruzeiro he again won the Copa Libertadores in 1997.

International career
During his golden era at São Paulo, Palhinha was selected to Brazil national team. He played for his country for 16 times, but was not managed to be selected again since 1993.

Honours

Club
Campeonato Paulista: 1992
Copa Libertadores: 1992, 1993, 1997
Intercontinental Cup (Toyota Cup): 1992, 1993
U.S. Cup: 1993
Recopa Sudamericana: 1993, 1994
Supercopa Libertadores: 1993
Copa Conmebol: 1994
Copa dos Campeões Brasileiros: 1994, 1995
Campeonato Mineiro: 1996, 1997
Copa Brasil: 1996
Campeonato Gaúcho: 1999
Peruvian Primera División: 2001
Campeonato Paulista Série A2: 2002
Campeonato Mineiro Módulo II: 2004
Ramón de Carranza Trophy: 1992
Copa de Barcelona: 1993
Torneio de Santiago do Chile: 1994
Copa da cidade de Dallas: 1995

Individual
Campeonato Paulista top scorer: 1992
Copa Libertadores's top scorer: 1992

References

External links
 Sambafoot profile

1967 births
Living people
Brazilian footballers
Brazilian expatriate footballers
Brazilian expatriate sportspeople in Spain
Brazil international footballers
1993 Copa América players
América Futebol Clube (MG) players
São Paulo FC players
Cruzeiro Esporte Clube players
RCD Mallorca players
CR Flamengo footballers
Grêmio Foot-Ball Porto Alegrense players
Botafogo Futebol Clube (SP) players
Sporting Cristal footballers
Sociedade Esportiva do Gama players
 Copa Libertadores-winning players
Club Alianza Lima footballers
Marília Atlético Clube players
Uberaba Sport Club players
Ipatinga Futebol Clube players
Campeonato Brasileiro Série A players
La Liga players
Associação Chapecoense de Futebol players
Expatriate footballers in Peru
Expatriate footballers in Spain
Association football forwards 
Association football midfielders